("freshwater trout river") is a Japanese surname and place name.

People
Yoshisuke Aikawa (Gisuke Ayukawa), entrepreneur, businessman, and politician
Makoto Ayukawa, guitarist, composer, member of the Japanese rock band Sheena & The Rokkets
Mami Ayukawa, singer-songwriter
Tetsuya Ayukawa, mystery fiction writer
Yoshifumi Ayukawa, baseball player

Places
Ayukawa, a whaling port in Miyagi prefecture, now a part of Ishinomaki.

Fictional characters
Emi Ayukawa / Fonda Fontaine, from the anime series, Yu-Gi-Oh! GX
Hitomi Ayukawa, from the Japanese PC erotic game, Miko Miko Nurse
Madoka Ayukawa, from the manga/anime series, Kimagure Orange Road
 Tenri Ayukawa, from the manga/anime series, The World God Only Knows
Keita Ayukawa, from the visual novel, Atlach-Nacha
Ran Ayukawa / B-Fighter Tentou, from the Tokusatsu TV series, B-Fighter Kabuto
Ryuji "Yuka" Ayukawa (鮎川龍二, Ayukawa Ryuji), from the manga/anime series, Blue Period

Japanese-language surnames